County Down was a constituency represented in the Irish House of Commons until 1800.

History
In the Patriot Parliament of 1689 summoned by James II, Down was represented with two members.

Members of Parliament

1585–1801

Notes

Elections

Elections in the 1790s

At the 1797 general election Francis Savage and Robert Stewart, Viscount Castlereagh were elected unopposed.

At the by-election in 1793 following Hill's succession as second Marquess of Downshire, Francis Savage was returned unopposed.

Election in the 1780s

Elections in the 1770s

At the 1776 general election Arthur Hill, Viscount Kilwarlin and Robert Stewart were elected unopposed.

At the by-election in 1771 following Ward's creation as Baron Bangor

Elections in the 1760s

At the 1768 general election Roger Hall and Bernard Ward were elected unopposed.

Election in the 1610s

"In the co. of Down, May-day was the county court day for the election, which the sheriff held at Newry, at which day the sheriff proceeding to the election, moved the freeholders to choose Sir Richard Wingfield and Sir James Hamilton, being recommended to him by the Lord Deputy; but the natives named Sir Arthur Magenisse and Rowland Savage; whereupon all the British freeholders, being 131, cried “Hamilton and Montgomery”, omitting Wingfield; and the Irish, to the number of 101, cried “Magenisse and Savage”. Exception being presently taken to divers of the British for want of freehold, 14 were examined on oath by the sheriff and deposed they were freeholders, and thereupon the sheriff returned Hamilton and Montgomery; to which some of the Irish made objections, which were found partly untrue, and partly frivolous."

References

Bibliography

Peter Jupp, County Down Elections, 1783–1831, Irish Historical Studies 18, no. 70 (1972): 177–206

Constituencies of the Parliament of Ireland (pre-1801)
Historic constituencies in County Down
1800 disestablishments in Ireland
Constituencies disestablished in 1800